Alexandru "Alex" Cristian Stan (born 25 September 2005) is a Romanian professional footballer who plays as a forward for Liga I club Rapid București.

Club career

Rapid București
He made his debut on 18 December 2022 for Rapid București in Liga I match against UTA Arad.

Career statistics

Club

References

External links
 
 

2005 births
Living people
Footballers from Bucharest
Romanian footballers
Association football midfielders
Liga I players
FC Rapid București players